Lisen Hockings is an Australian racing cyclist in Holden Team Gusto Racing. She is also an anaesthetist in Melbourne and has previously played Hockey and Volleyball.

Results
2016
3rd Oceania Cycling Championships road race
2017
1st  Oceania Cycling Championships, Road Race
3rd Oceania Cycling Championships time trial

References

External links

Australian female cyclists
Living people
1979 births
20th-century Australian women
21st-century Australian women